Passenger is the second and Choice Music Prize nominated album from Irish singer-songwriter Lisa Hannigan. The album was released in the US and Canada on 20 September 2011 and in the Republic of Ireland on 7 October 2011 (brought forward from the originally scheduled date, 21 October). The LP features 11 new tracks.

The album was self-released in Ireland and UK through her label, Hoop Records. The album was released in North America through Barp-ATO Records and later for Europe in 2012 on PIAS Recordings.

In 2012 it was awarded a silver certification from the Independent Music Companies Association, which indicated sales of at least 20,000 copies throughout Europe.

Recording
Writing for the album began in late 2009 and throughout 2010 in Ireland and the US. In March 2011, Hannigan revealed the track "A Sail" as part of her "Recording Diaries" which were shot during the recording of the album in Wales. Available from her YouTube page the "Recording Diaries" gave fans the opportunity to go behind the making of the new album. "A Sail" would later be released on her website in August 2011 as a free download. The album was released in Ireland at a later date as Hannigan was on tour throughout the US in September and early October. On the track "O Sleep" it features the vocals of Ray LaMontagne.

Singles
The first song available from the album "A Sail" was released as a free download in August 2011 from lisahannigan.ie. The first official single from the album was "Knots", this was released as a download on 12 September 2011 in Europe.

Track listing

Critical reception
Entertainment.ie gave the album 4/5 stars claiming that it was "difficult to resist the allure." Similarly, The Scotsman gave the album 4/5 stars declaring that it is "rich and (a) rewarding listen." The Irish Times gave the album another 4/5 stars. On the 7Digital download service front page, Tippy Wooder, a contributor to UK music magazine The Word, described Passenger as "expanding pleasingly on the promise of Sea Sew, with journeys (emotional and actual) being a recurring theme".

Tour
Lisa Hannigan's US and Canadian tour started on 27 September 2011 in Los Angeles she performed for seventeen dates, on this tour. In early October she announced some European dates (beginning in the UK) and, on 13 October 2011, the remaining Irish leg of the European tour was announced.

Charts

Release history

Awards
Passenger was nominated for the Choice Music Prize in January 2012.

|-
| 2012 || Passenger || Irish Album of the Year 2011 || 
|-

References

External links
 Official site

2011 albums
Lisa Hannigan albums
Albums produced by Joe Henry